Gerald Browne may refer to:
 Gerald Browne (politician) (1871/1872–1951), Unionist politician in Northern Ireland
 Gerald A. Browne (1924–2015), American author and editor
 Gerald Browne (cricketer) (1850–1910), British cricket player
 Gerald Michael Browne (1943–2004), American professor of classics
 Gerald Browne, 7th Earl of Kenmare (1896–1952), Earl of Kenmare

See also
Gerald Brown (disambiguation)
Gerry Browne (disambiguation)